Vijay Dahiya  (born 10 May 1973) is a former Indian wicketkeeper. He is current coach of the Uttar Pradesh cricket team and assistant coach of Lucknow Super Giants in Indian Premier League.

First class career 
Dahiya was a right-handed batsman and wicket-keeper who started playing First-class cricket for Delhi in 1993/94. He made his international debut during the 2000/01 series against Zimbabwe.

Dahiya was also a part of the North Zone cricket team which won the Duleep and Deodhar Trophies during the 1999/00 season. In 2009, Dahiya was appointed as the assistant coach of Kolkata Knight Riders, the Kolkata-based franchise cricket team of the Indian Premier League.

Dahiya made his first-class debut against Punjab at Ludhiana in the 1993/94 season. He was an integral part of the North Zone team which lifted the Duleep and Deodhar Trophies in 1999–2000, and also captained Delhi for some time. Dahiya retired from all forms of cricket after playing his last match against Uttar Pradesh in December 2006. Just before retirement, he began his Ranji season with a fine 102, his highest first-class score, against Tamil Nadu that bailed Delhi out of trouble, and effected a stumping against Uttar Pradesh's Praveen Kumar that helped his side gain a vital first-innings lead.

International career 

Dahiya's international debut was in an ODI against Kenya at Nairobi Gymkhana in October 2000 in the ICC Knockout Trophy. His contribution in that match which India eventually won was a catch. He went on to play in total 19 ODI's for India.

The last of which was against Australia at Fatorda Stadium in the 2001 series. Dahiya's highest ODI score was a knock of 51 runs maintaining a strike rate above par against Australia in the 1st ODI at M. Chinnaswamy Stadium which helped set up a match winning total of 315.

Dahiya made his Test debut against Zimbabwe at his home ground Feroz Shah Kotla in November 2000 as the match ended in a draw. He played only one more Test match against the same opponent at Vidarbha Cricket Association Stadium. In the second match, Dahiya took 6 catches.

Coaching career 

He was named Delhi coach in 2007/08 season and was sacked 2013/14 season due to his Kolkata Knight Riders commitments. During this period he led them to a Ranji Trophy triumph in 2007–08 season to end a 16-year title drought. 
He was appointed the assistant coach of the IPL franchise Kolkata Knight Riders in 2009.

In September 2014, he was re-appointed  as the head coach of the Delhi's Ranji Trophy side for 2014/15 season.

In December 2019, he was appointed as head talent scout of the IPL franchise Delhi Capitals. In September 2021, he was named as the head coach of Uttar Pradesh ahead of the 2021/22 season in India.

In December 2021, he was appointed as Assistant coach of Lucknow Super Giants.

References

External links 

1973 births
Living people
Indian cricketers
India Test cricketers
India One Day International cricketers
North Zone cricketers
Delhi cricketers
Indian cricket coaches
Indian Premier League coaches
Wicket-keepers